Ricardo Mbarkho (25 January 1974 in Beirut, Lebanon), is a Lebanese contemporary artist, researcher, and assistant professor.

Mbarkho's work includes multiple outcomes especially digital art practices.

In his digital images, as well as in his time-based work, he investigates multiple questions related to interactivity, language, communication, cultural industries, history of art as well as the visual representation within the sociopolitical sphere. Mbarkho's digital images are made from texts. He uses the computer as a tool to mutate texts into images; the text's binary codes are transposed into a unique corresponding visual.

Mbarkho received his art diplomas from Université Sorbonne Paris Nord, École nationale supérieure des beaux-arts and École supérieure d'études cinématographiques, Paris, and from Institut supérieur des beaux-arts, Beirut. He also completed an exchange study program at Carnegie Mellon University - College of Fine Arts, Pittsburgh, PA, USA.

He lives and works in Beirut.

Publications 
 Mbarkho, Ricardo (2016). « L’interdépendance dialectique entre création artistique médiatique et industries culturelles », in Fann wa imarah journal, Issue No. 6, Institute of the Fine Arts – Lebanese University.
 Mbarak, Ricardo (2015). « Pour une double définition des relations entre création médiatique et industries culturelles », in Al Hikma journal, 3rd period, Eighth year, Number 14
 Mbarkho, Ricardo, Dussolier, Claudine, Nawar, Abdo (2014). Presentation of RAMI Platform in Lebanon
 Mbarkho, Ricardo (2012). Response to With the benefit of hindsight, what role does new media play in artistic practices, activism, and as an agent for social change in the Middle East and North Africa today?], Ibraaz online forum
 Mbarkho, Ricardo (2013). « Trauma Stimulated Art, or the Embodiment of Affect in Lebanon: An Allegory », in Traumatic Affect. Cambridge Scholars Publishers
 Mbarkho, Ricardo (2012). « On New Media and Creativity in Lebanon », Leonardo, Journal of the International Society for the Arts, Sciences and Technology (Leonardo/ISAST), Volume 45, Numéro 2, The MIT Press
 Mbarkho, Ricardo (2011). On New Media and Creativity in the Lebanese Setting: 2008–2011, published by The MIT Press in Leonardo Electronic Almanac (LEA) (Leonardo/ISAST)
 Mbarkho, Ricardo (2011). Lecture in « Conferences on the History and the Future of the Internet » – WJ-SPOTS
 Mbarkho, Ricardo (2010). « A different kind of media creativity in the Lebanon », in Cultures and Globalization Series 2009 : Cultural Expression, Creativity &  Innovation. SAGE Ed.
 Mbarkho, Ricardo (2008). Introduction to Art and New Media in the Arab States, with a case-study of Lebanon, in Visual Narratives from Arabia – Online Master Module on Art, Design and Technology. © UNESCO

References

External links
 www.ricardombarkho.com, Personal Website of Ricardo Mbarkho

Living people
1974 births
Academic staff of the University of Balamand
Lebanese contemporary artists
Post-conceptual artists